The crane is a mystical or holy creature (others include the dragon and the tortoise) in Japan and is said to live for a thousand years. That is why  are made, one for each year. In some stories, it is believed that the cranes must be completed within one year and they must all be made by the person (or group of people) who will make the wish at the end.

Cultural significance
In Japan, cranes have been thought a symbol of long life. An old fix phrases says "cranes live a thousand years". Here "a thousand" is not necessarily to designate the exact number, but a poetic expression of huge amounts. Historically well-wishers offered a picture of a crane to shrines and temples as well as paper cranes. Origami, specially crafted and pattern-printed paper was invented in Edo period, and in the late 17th century books referring not only to "paper cranes" but also to "one thousand cranes" were published. 

Nowadays, cranes are often given to a person who is seriously ill, to wish for their recovery. They are usually created by friends, classmates, or colleagues as a collective effort, offered to a shrine on the person's behalf or directly gifted to. Another common use is for sports teams or athletes, wishing them victories. Cranes are also a symbol of peace, and are thus often seen at war memorials along with its original meaning for wishing good health. 

Several temples, including some in Tokyo and Hiroshima, have eternal flames for world peace. At these temples, school groups or individuals often donate senbazuru to add to the prayer for peace. The cranes are left exposed to the elements, slowly becoming tattered and dissolving as symbolically, the wish is released. In this way, they are related to the prayer flags of India and Tibet.

The Japanese space agency JAXA used the folding of one thousand cranes as one of the tests for candidates of its astronaut program.

Sadako Sasaki
The one thousand origami cranes were globally popularized through the story of Sadako Sasaki, a Japanese girl who was two years old when she was exposed to radiation from the atomic bombing of Hiroshima during World War II. Sasaki soon developed leukemia and, at age 12 after spending a significant amount of time in a hospital, began making origami cranes with the goal of making one thousand, inspired by the senbazuru legend. In a fictionalized version of the story as told in the book Sadako and the Thousand Paper Cranes, she folded only 644 before she became too weak to fold anymore, and died on 25 October 1955. To honor her memory, her classmates agreed to fold the remaining 356 cranes for her. In the version of the story told by her family and classmates, the Hiroshima Peace Memorial Museum states that she did complete the 1,000 cranes and continued past that when her wish failed to come true. There is a statue of Sadako holding a crane in Hiroshima Peace Memorial Park, and every year on Obon day, people leave cranes at the statue in memory of the departed spirits of their ancestors.

According to her family, and especially her older brother Masahiro Sasaki, who speaks on his sister's life at events, Sadako not only exceeded 644 cranes, she exceeded her goal of 1,000 and died having folded approximately 1,400 paper cranes. In his book, The Complete Story of Sadako Sasaki, co-written with Sue DiCicco, founder of the Peace Crane Project, Masahiro says Sadako exceeded her goal.

Materials
Sets of origami paper are sold widely in Japan, with senbazuru sets including about one thousand sheets of paper, string, and beads to place at the end of each string to stop the cranes from slipping off. Commonly, the cranes are assembled as 25 strings of 40 cranes each.

The size of the origami paper does not matter when assembling a thousand paper cranes, but smaller sheets consequently yield smaller and lighter strings of cranes. Some people cut their own squares of paper from anything available, such as magazines, newspapers, notebooks, and printer paper.

Origami paper used for senbazuru is usually of a solid color, though patterned designs are available. Larger size origami paper, usually 6×6 inches, often has traditional Japanese or flower designs, reminiscent of kimono patterns.

See also
 Children's Peace Monument
 Kunihiko Kasahara (See Vol. 3 of his listed publications)
 Orizuru
 Sadako and the Thousand Paper Cranes
 Sadako Sasaki

Notes and references

External links 
 

1000 (number)
Japanese culture
Origami
Peace symbols